Kosciuszko Road is a road in the Snowy Mountains of New South Wales, Australia which runs from , to the ski resort of  in Kosciuszko National Park.

Route

History
The passing of the Main Roads Act of 1924 through the Parliament of New South Wales provided for the declaration of Main Roads, roads partially funded by the State government through the Main Roads Board (later the Department of Main Roads, and eventually Transport for NSW). Main Road No. 286 was declared along this road on 8 August 1928, from the intersection with Monaro Highway (today Snowy Mountains Highway) at Pine Valley via Berriedale and Jindabyne to Mount Kosciuszko.

The passing of the Roads Act of 1993 updated road classifications and the way they could be declared within New South Wales. Under this act, Kosciuszko Road today retains its declaration as Main Road 286, from Pine Valley to Charlotte Pass.

Gallery

See also

 Highways in Australia
 Highways in New South Wales

References

Skiing in Australia
Snowy Mountains
Roads in New South Wales